The Devils Island Lighthouse is a lighthouse located on Devils Island, one of the Apostle Islands, in Lake Superior in Ashland County, Wisconsin, near the city of Bayfield.

Currently owned by the National Park Service and part of the Apostle Islands National Lakeshore, it is a contributing property to the Apostle Islands Lighthouses and was added to the National Register of Historic Places in 1977.. It is also listed in the Library of Congress Historic American Buildings Survey, WI-324. Several other structures in the vicinity are also listed in HABS.

The original third order Fresnel lens manufactured by Henry-Lepaute was removed by the U.S. Coast Guard in 1989, but a new third order Fresnel lens was replaced by the N.P.S. in 1992.

The site originally had a  steam whistle in a fog signal building.  That was removed in 1925, and "a much improved air-operated diaphone fog signal" was accomplished.  In 1928, a diesel-powered electrical generator was installed, and the light intensity increased to 300,000 candela for the white flash and 180,000 candela for the red.

A previous skeletal, wooden structure was constructed in 1891 has since been demolished. Historical brick Queen Anne style keepers quarters (1896) are collocated with the current lighthouse. Also on the premises were two oil houses, a tramway, a brownstone tramway engine building, a dock, wooden boathouse (1 mile distant) and a radio beacon.

Getting there
Most of the Apostle Islands Lighthouses may be reached on the Apostle Islands Cruise Service water taxi or by private boat during the summer. During the Annual Apostle Island Lighthouse Celebration ferry tour service is available for all the lighthouses. In the tourist season, volunteer park rangers are on many of the islands to greet visitors.

See also
Wisconsin lighthouses

References

Further reading

 Devils Island Light Station. Lighthouse Digest (Jan 1999), pp. 14–15.
 Havighurst, Walter (1943) The Long Ships Passing: The Story of the Great Lakes, Macmillan Publishers.
 Oleszewski, Wes, Great Lakes Lighthouses, American and Canadian: A Comprehensive Directory/Guide to Great Lakes Lighthouses, (Gwinn, Michigan: Avery Color Studios, Inc., 1998) .
 
 Wright, Larry and Wright, Patricia, Great Lakes Lighthouses Encyclopedia Hardback (Erin: Boston Mills Press, 2006) .

External links
 Aerial photos of Devils Island Light, Marina.com.
Anderson, Kraig. Lighthouse friends Devil's Island Light article.
Library of Congress Historic American Buildings Survey Survey number HABS WI-324
Library of Congress Historic American Buildings Survey Survey number HABS WI-324-A
 National Park Service, Maritime History Project, Inventory of Historic Light Stations - Wisconsin, Devils Island Light.
NPS - Devils Island Light Station
Terry Pepper, Seeing the Light, Devil's Island Light.

 
 Wobser, David, Devil's Island Lights, Boatnerd originally in Great Laker Magazine.

Lighthouses completed in 1891
Houses completed in 1896
Lighthouses completed in 1901
Lighthouses in Ashland County, Wisconsin
Lighthouses on the National Register of Historic Places in Wisconsin
National Register of Historic Places in Ashland County, Wisconsin